The Lucas Oil Pro Pulling League (sometimes abbreviated as PPL) was an American professional truck and tractor pulling series sponsored by California-based Lucas Oil featuring Super Modified tractors as well as Pro Modified Four-Wheel Drive trucks, Super Modified two-wheel drive trucks, Pro Stock tractors, and hot rod semi-tractor trucks, among other classes. It bills itself as "...showcasing the most extreme vehicles and the most talented pulling drivers in the world." It has been described as the "premiere pulling series" in the United States.

History
Lucas Oil began their foray into American pulling when they became the title sponsor for the now-absorbed American Tractor Pullers Association in 2003 when it became known as the ATPA Lucas Oil Pulling Series. Forrest Lucas, the founder of Lucas Oil, created the PPL in 2005 after the ATPA folded soon after Lucas Oil's initial sponsorship.

Lucas Oil discontinued ownership and operation in November of 2022

Rules
Rules in the PPL are similar to other pulling leagues and the maximum boundary limit is 320 feet.

Participants
Competitors can compete for cash purses in four series: Champion Tour, Silver Series, Mid-West Region, and Western Series. There are no full-time pulling teams in the League, only hobbyists (sometimes serious) who are "trying to have as much fun as possible." Although many of the pullers in the League are associated with the automotive or farming businesses, there are some who come from fields unrelated, such as dentistry. As if 2016, the PPL has over twenty classes of pulling vehicles one can participate in. As of 2016, direct family members of registered PPL pullers who are graduating high school seniors are eligible for college scholarships.

Related media
In the United States it is broadcast on the Lucas Oil-owned MAVTV on Thursday evenings. In 2013, PPL announced the creation of its own magazine titled, Pro Pulling Magazine, but the current status of this periodical is unknown.

See also
National Tractor Pullers Association

References

Tractor pulling
Sports governing bodies in the United States
Pro Pulling Series